In the 1930s the American inventor Brooks Walker invented a device which used added a fifth wheel to cars to aid parallel parking. The extra wheel was mounted on the rear of the vehicle, at right angles to the rest of the wheels. When in use, the fifth wheel lifted the weight of the back of the car off its normal rear wheels, allowing the rear of the car to be swung laterally.

Walker was granted a patent for his device, described as a "vehicle lifting and traversing device", in 1935. He also demonstrated the device in operation, and the device was featured in LIFE magazine.

In spite of this, he was unable to sell his invention to the car industry. Walker continued to attempt to market his device into the 1970s.

References 

American inventions
1930s establishments in the United States
Parking